Tabarin Peninsula is a peninsula 15 nautical miles (28 km) long and 5 to 12 nautical miles (22 km) wide, lying south of the trough between Hope Bay and Duse Bay and forming the east extremity of Trinity Peninsula in the Antarctic Peninsula. It was discovered and charted by the Swedish Antarctic Expedition, 1901–1904, led by Otto Nordenskjöld and Carl Anton Larsen.  It was mapped in 1946 by the Falkland Islands Dependencies Survey (FIDS) and named after Operation Tabarin, the naval code name for the FIDS from 1943 to 1945.

Geography

To the east of the peninsula lies the Antarctic Sound and Trepassey Bay is an indentation half way along the east coast and above it is a basalt tuya known as Brown Bluff. Cape Green and Cape Burd form the southerly extremities before the coast turns north into Duse Bay. Recently, more of the ground surface of the peninsula has become exposed by the melting of ice, and its geological structure is becoming clearer. Near Trepassey Bay there is a  bed of steeply-dipping quartz-rich sandstones and mudstones which are probably part of the Hope Bay Formation dating to the Permian-Triassic. Dioritic rocks in this area are probably part of the early Cretaceous Antarctic Peninsula batholith. Rocks exposed above Duse Bay are Mesozoic marine sediments dipping gently to the southeast, and consisting of 60% coarse-grained conglomerates, 30% mudstones and 10% sandstones.

Cairn Hill and Mineral Hill are located on the peninsula.

Flora and fauna

The crumbling cliffs of Brown Bluff tower over Trepassey Bay, causing rock falls and scree slopes, and some wind-eroded boulders fall to the beach below. There are a few lichens on boulders at the top of the beach and some mosses grow higher up the slope, but no vascular plants grow here. Weddell seals often haul out on the beach and leopard seals hunt offshore. This is a breeding site for gentoo and Adélie penguins, Cape petrels, snow petrels, skuas and kelp gulls. Other birds that probably breed here include the southern giant petrel, the southern fulmar and Wilson's storm petrel.

References

Peninsulas of Graham Land
Landforms of Trinity Peninsula